Professor Maheswar Neog (7 September 1915 – 13 September 1995) was an Indian academic who specialised in the cultural history of the North East India especially Assam, besides being an Assamese-language scholar and poet. He was a top Indologist, and his work covers all disciplines of Indian studies, folk-lore, language, dance, history, music, religion, drama, fine arts, paintings, historiography and hagiography, lexicography and orthography, epigraphy and ethnography. His research includes multi-dimensional features of Vaishnava renaissance in Assam through Srimanta Sankardev, Madhabdev, Damodardev, Haridev, Bhattadev and other Vaishnava saints of Assam.

An editorial in The Assam Tribune called him "a versatile scholar and visionary thinker with encyclopedic range." He remained Jawaharlal Nehru Professor at Gauhati University and later Saint Sankaradeva Professor at Punjabi University.

He was awarded the Padma Shri, India's fourth highest civilian honour in 1974, also in the same year he remained the President of Asam Sahitya Sabha (Assam Literary Society). In 1994, he was awarded the Sangeet Natak Akademi Fellowship the highest honour conferred by Sangeet Natak Akademi, India's National Academy for Music, Dance and Drama.

Bibliography

References

1915 births
1995 deaths
Cultural history of Assam
Cultural historians
Scholars from Assam
Assamese-language poets
Academic staff of Gauhati University
Poets from Assam
Asom Sahitya Sabha Presidents
People from Sivasagar district
Recipients of the Padma Shri in literature & education
Recipients of the Sangeet Natak Akademi Fellowship
20th-century Indian poets
20th-century Indian historians
Academic staff of Punjabi University
Indian male poets
Historians of Northeast India
20th-century Indian male writers